Monterosso Almo is a comune in the province of Ragusa, Sicilia, southern Italy.

Located on the central plaza is the Baroque church of San Giovanni Battista.

References

External links
  

Municipalities of the Province of Ragusa